Lāhor, also known as Little Lahore (Pashto: ,), previously known as Salatura, is a town within the Swabi District of Khyber Pakhtunkhwa, Pakistan. The town serves as the headquarters of the Lahor Tehsil and is administratively subdivided into two union councils. In the vicinity of Lahor are Panjpir, Hund and Zaida three other cities of the ancient world.

Administration
The village of Lahor contains two Union Councils, Lahor Gharbi and Lahor Sharqi (East and West), each Union is administered by its own nazim.

History
Lahor has a very old history. Outside Lahor, there are some high mounds which likely contain ancient sites. Historians believe that a town called Śalātura existed in the vicinity, where the Sanskrit grammarian Panini probably lived. The Chinese traveller Huan Tsang visited the city in the 7th century AD and reported that there was said to have been a statue for Panini in the town (but not present in his time).

Although it is known that Panini (c. 450 - 350 BCE) was born in Śalātura, a small town near Attock on the northwestern Indian peninsula in what is now Pakistan, historians remain uncertain as to the exact dates of Panini's birth and death. One theory, supported by internal references that indicate Panini had contact with or was at least aware of Greek civilization, place his life after the year 327 BCE, when Macedonian Alexander the Great reached northwestern India. However, historical evidence supports limited contact between the two civilizations as early as the sixth century BCE.

Alexander the Great is said to have passed through the area, in trying to cross the Indus River through the Hund. He is also said to have faced significant resistance from the people of Lahor. The oldest Lahor port located in Mohallah Ghari Khankhail (GKK) shows Lahor being among Alexander's possessions.

References

External links
 Biography of Panini
 Panini at answers.com

Bibliography

 Coward, Harold G., and K. Kunjunni Raja, Encyclopedia of Indian Philosophies: The Philosophy of the Grammarians, Princeton University Press, 1990.
 Daniélou, Alain, A Brief History of India, translated by Kenneth Hurry, Inner Traditions, 2003.
 Kulke, Hermann, and Dietmar Rothermund, A History of India, third edition, Routledge, 1998.
 MacDonell, Arthur A., A History of Sanskrit Literature, Motilal Banarsidass Publishers, 1900.
 A Sanskrit Grammar for Students, third edition, Oxford University Press, 1927.
 India's Past, Oxford University Press, 1927.
 Mohanty, J. N., Classical Indian Philosophy, Rowman & Little-field, 2000.
 Panini, Astadhyayi, translated by Sumitra M. Katre, University of Texas Press, 1987.

Populated places in Swabi District